Maksim Yuryevich Levin (born 6 May 1999) is a Russian football player. He plays for FC Murom.

Club career
He made his debut in the Russian Football National League for FC Zenit-2 Saint Petersburg on 3 March 2019 in a game against FC Shinnik Yaroslavl, as a 66th-minute substitute for Daniil Shamkin.

He was called up to the senior team of FC Zenit Saint Petersburg in February 2021 for a Russian Cup game against FC Arsenal Tula, but remained on the bench.

In the summer of 2022, he signed a contract with FC Murom. On 16 July, in his debut game for the new club, he scored a goal against FC Tekstilshchik Ivanovo.

References

External links
 Profile by Russian Football National League

1999 births
Footballers from Saint Petersburg
Living people
Russian footballers
Russia youth international footballers
Association football midfielders
FC Zenit-2 Saint Petersburg players
Russian First League players
Russian Second League players